Mir Muhammad Taqi (February 1723 – 20 September 1810), known as Mir Taqi Mir (also spelled Meer Taqi Meer), was an Urdu poet of the 18th century Mughal India and one of the pioneers who gave shape to the Urdu language itself. His father's name was Meer Muttaqi. After his father's death, his step-Brothers took control over his property. His step-uncle took care of him after he was orphaned and after the death of his step-uncle(paternal) his maternal step-uncle took care of him. The  part of his poetry is the grief he expresses. He has expressed a lot of grief over the downfall of his city, Delhi. He was one of the principal poets of the Delhi School of the Urdu ghazal and is often remembered as one of the best poets of the Urdu language. His pen name (takhallus) was Mir. He spent the latter part of his life in the court of Asaf-ud-Daulah in Lucknow.

Life
The main source of information on Mir's life is his autobiography Zikr-e-Mir, which covers the period from his childhood to the beginning of his sojourn in Lucknow. However, it is said to conceal more than it reveals, with material that is undated or presented in no chronological sequence. Therefore, many of the 'true details' of Mir's life remain a matter of speculation.

Early life and background 
Mir was born in Agra, India (then called Akbarabad and ruled by the Mughals) in August or February 1723. His grandfather had migrated from Hejaz to Hyderabad, then to Akbarabad or Agra. His philosophy of life was formed primarily by his father, Mir Abdullah, a religious man with a large following, whose emphasis on the importance of love and the value of compassion remained with Mir throughout his life and imbued his poetry. Mir's father died while the poet was in his teens, and left him some debt. Mir left Agra for Delhi a few years after his father's death, to finish his education and also to find patrons who offered him financial support (Mir's many patrons and his relationship with them have been described by his translator C. M. Naim). He was given a daily allowance by the Mughal Amir-ul-Umara and Mir Bakhshi, Khan-i Dauran, who was another native of Agra.

Some scholars consider two of Mir's masnavis (long narrative poems rhymed in couplets), Mu'amlat-e-ishq (The Stages of Love) and Khwab o Khyal-e Mir ("Mir's Vision"), written in the first person, as inspired by Mir's own early love affairs, but it is by no means clear how autobiographical these accounts of a poet's passionate love affair and descent into madness are. Especially, as Frances W. Pritchett points out, the austere portrait of Mir from these masnavis must be juxtaposed against the picture drawn by Andalib Shadani, whose inquiry suggests a very different poet, given to unabashed eroticism in his verse.

Life in Lucknow 

Mir lived much of his life in Mughal Delhi. Kuchha Chelan, in Old Delhi was his address at that time. However, after Ahmad Shah Abdali's sack of Delhi each year starting 1748, he eventually moved to the court of Asaf-ud-Daulah in Lucknow, at the ruler's invitation. Distressed to witness the plundering of his beloved Delhi, he gave vent to his feelings through some of his couplets.

Mir migrated to Lucknow in 1782 and stayed there for the remainder of his life. Though he was given a kind welcome by Asaf-ud-Daulah, he found that he was considered old-fashioned by the courtiers of Lucknow (Mir, in turn, was contemptuous of the new Lucknow poetry, dismissing the poet Jur'at's work as merely 'kissing and cuddling'). Mir's relationships with his patron gradually grew strained, and he eventually severed his connections with the court.  In his last years Mir was very isolated. His health failed, and the untimely deaths of his daughter, son and wife caused him great distress.

Death 
He died of a purgative overdose on 21 September 1810, and was buried in Lucknow. The marker of his burial place is believed to have been removed in modern times when railway tracks were built over his grave. In the 1970s, a cenotaph was built in the vicinity of his actual burial place.

Literary life
His complete works, Kulliaat, consist of six Diwans containing 13,585 couplets, comprising a variety of poetic forms: ghazal, masnavi, qasida, rubai, mustezaad, satire, etc. Mir's literary reputation is anchored on the ghazals in his Kulliyat-e-Mir, much of them on themes of love. His masnavi Mu'amlat-e-Ishq (The Stages of Love) is one of the greatest known love poems in Urdu literature.

Mir lived at a time when Urdu language and poetry was at a formative stage – and Mir's instinctive aesthetic sense helped him strike a balance between the indigenous expression and new enrichment coming in from Persian imagery and idiom, to constitute the new elite language known as Rekhta or Hindui. Basing his language on his native Hindustani, he leavened it with a sprinkling of Persian diction and phraseology, and created a poetic language at once simple, natural and elegant, which was to guide generations of future poets.

The death of his family members, together with earlier setbacks (including the traumatic stages in Delhi), lend a strong pathos to much of Mir's writing – and indeed Mir is noted for his poetry of pathos and melancholy.

Mir and Mirza Ghalib
Mir's famous contemporary, also an Urdu poet of no inconsiderable repute, was Mirza Rafi Sauda. Mir Taqi Mir was often compared with the later day Urdu poet, Mirza Ghalib. Lovers of Urdu poetry often debate Mir's supremacy over Ghalib or vice versa. It may be noted that Ghalib himself acknowledged, through some of his couplets, that Mir was indeed a genius who deserved respect. Here are two couplets by Mirza Ghalib on this matter.

Ghalib and Zauq were contemporary rivals but both of them believed in the greatness of Mir and also acknowledged Mir's greatness in their poetry.

Famous couplets
Some of his notable couplets are:

At a higher spiritual level, the subject of Mir's poem is not a woman but God. Mir speaks of man's interaction with the Divine. He reflects upon the impact on man when God reveals Himself to the man. So the same sher can be interpreted in this way as well:

Other shers:

Mir Taqi Mir in fiction
Khushwant Singh's famous novel Delhi: A Novel gives very interesting details about the life and adventures of the great poet.
Mah e Mir is a 2016 Pakistani biographical film directed by Anjum Shahzad in which Fahad Mustafa played Mir Taqi Mir.

Major works
 Nukat-us-Shura, a biographical dictionary of Urdu poets of his time, written in Persian.
 Faiz-e-Mir, a collection of five stories about Sufis & faqirs, said to have been written for the education of his son Mir Faiz Ali.
 Zikr-e-Mir, an autobiography written in Persian.
 Kulliyat-e-Farsi, a collection of poems in Persian
 Kulliyat-e-Mir, a collection of Urdu poetry consisting of six diwans (volumes).
 Mir Taqi Mir Ki Rubaiyat

See also

List of Urdu poets
Ghazal
Mah-e-Meer

References

Lall, Inder jit; Mir A Master Poet; Thought, 7 November 1964
Lall, Inder jit; Mir The ghazal king; Indian & Foreign Review, September 1984
Lall, Inder jit; Mir—Master of Urdu Ghazal; Patriot, 25 September 1988
Lall, Inder jit; 'A Mir' of ghazals; Financial Express, 3 November

Further reading
 The Anguished Heart: Mir and the Eighteenth Century: 'The Golden Tradition, An Anthology of Urdu Poetry', Ahmed Ali, pp 23–54; Poems:134-167, Columbia University Press, 1973/ OUP, Delhi, 1991

External links

A Garden of Kashmir: the Ghazals of Mir Taqi Mir
Dewaan-e-Meer (Online)
Meer Taqi Meer's poetry at Rekhta
Zikr e Mir: Biography of poet in Hindi on Scribd
The Meer Pages
 Sher e Shor Angez Vol.2 on Scribd 

1723 births
1810 deaths
People from Agra
Indian male poets
Urdu-language poets from India
18th-century Urdu-language writers
Urdu-language religious writers
Urdu-language writers from British India
Urdu-language writers from Mughal India
Urdu-language theologians
18th-century Indian poets
Poets from Uttar Pradesh
18th-century male writers